Lee Spick (25 April 1980 – 26 January 2015) was an English professional snooker player. A former English under-15 champion, he reached the last 48 of ranking events on five occasions, including twice in the World Championship.

Career
He reached the Quarter-Final of the 2000 Benson and Hedges Championship, with wins against Darren Morgan and Dean Reynolds, as well as others, before losing to Mark Davis 4–5. He also reached the Quarter-Final of the 2001 event, beating the likes of World Championship runner-up Nigel Bond, before losing out to future World Champion Shaun Murphy 3-5

He reached the last 48 of the 2006 World Championship and the 2007 China Open. Previously in the 2005 World Championship he had victories over David Gilbert 10–5, before a remarkable 10–7 win over Ding Junhui, which put him only 2 matches away from a place at the Crucible, but Stuart Bingham denied him with a 10–2 victory. In the 2007 China Open he defeated Jeff Cundy, Tony Drago and Dominic Dale.

In the 2007 UK Championships qualifying in 2007, he defeated Jimmy White 9–7 in arguably one of the best results during his career, but he lost 8–9 to Andrew Higginson in the following round.

At the 2008 China Open, Spick defeated Ashley Wright, Rod Lawler and Mark Davis, before losing in the Last 48 to Dave Harold 0–5.

2008/09 season started relatively quiet for Spick. However, after recording impressive wins over Stephen Craigie (10–5), Barry Pinches (10–5) and Adrian Gunnell (10–2), he was within one match of reaching the Crucible for the first time in his career but lost narrowly 8–10 to Steve Davis. Spick seemed to carry that form into the next season, as he reached the last 48 stage of the Shanghai Masters, however he failed to win a further match during the season and as a result was relegated from the tour.

After having missed the opportunities to return to main tour via Q School in 2011 and 2012, Spick announced his retirement from snooker. However he decided to come back to Q School in 2013, and at Event 3 he defeated Darrell Whitworth, Sanderson Lam, Darren Cook and Duane Jones to win a two-year card for the 2013–14 and 2014–15 seasons. Spick's return proved to be short-lived however, as he only played two matches, losing both, and had multiple withdrawals due to lack of sponsorship and the resulting depression. He never entered another professional tournament after the 2013 UK Championship.

Illness and death
World Snooker announced the death of Spick on 26 January 2015, after a liver-related illness.

Performance and rankings timeline

Career finals

Non-ranking finals: 2 (2 titles)

Amateur finals: 1 (1 title)

References

External links
 
 Profile on worldsnooker.com
 Profile on global-snooker.com

English snooker players
1980 births
2015 deaths
Sportspeople from Mansfield
Deaths from liver disease